Rubén Hernández may refer to:

 Rubén Darío Hernández (born 1965), former Colombian footballer
 Rubén Hernández (fencer) (born 1954), Puerto Rican fencer